Margaret Stoughton Abell (June 25, 1908 – February 22, 2004) was an American forester.

Early life 
On June 25, 1908, Abell was born as Margaret Stoughton in Osage, Iowa. Abell's father was Herbert Leonard Stoughton. Abell's mother was Elizabeth (née Higgins) Stoughton.

Education 
In 1929, as a student and Junior Forester, Abell wrote a paper titled "A Glimpse of the Appalachian Forest Experiment Station".
In 1930, Abell graduated with a bachelor's degree in forestry from Iowa State College in Ames, Iowa.

Career 
In June 1930, Abell joined the Appalachian Forest Experimental Station in Asheville, North Carolina. Abell was also a skilled photographer. Abell became the first woman research forester in the Forest Service. In 1937, Abell left Forest Service.

Personal life 
Abell married Charles A. Abell, a forester. They have three children, Jean E. Abell Porter, Susan Marie Abell, and Barbara Abell Borgers. On February 22, 2004, Abell died in Corvallis, Oregon. She was 95.

Legacy 
As a woman in the male dominated field of forestry, Abell's life is celebrated during International Woman's Day. In addition, Abell's life is also celebrated during Women's History month.

Published works 
This is a selected list of published papers by Abell.
 A Glimpse of the Appalachian Forest Experiment Station (1929)(1933 abstract). 
 Basal Fire Wounds on Some Southern Appalachian Hardwood (1933 abstract). Co-author.

See also 
 Bent Creek Campus of the Appalachian Forest Experiment Station
 United States Forest Service

References

External links 

 US Forest Service

1908 births
2004 deaths
American foresters